The battle of Beroia took place in June 1208 near the city of Stara Zagora, Bulgaria between the Bulgarians and the Latin Empire. It resulted in a Bulgarian victory.

Origins of the conflict 

In the summer of 1208 the new Emperor of Bulgaria Boril who continued the war of his predecessor Kaloyan against the Latin Empire invaded Eastern Thrace. The Latin Emperor Henry gathered an army in Selymbria (Silivri) and headed to Adrianople (Odrin).

The battle 

Upon the news of the Crusaders' march, the Bulgarians retreated to better positions in the area of Beroia (Stara Zagora). At night, they sent the Byzantine captives and the spoil to the north of the Balkan Mountains and moved in a battle formation to the Latin camp, which was not fortified. At dawn, they suddenly attacked and the soldiers on duty put up a fierce fight to gain some time for the rest to prepare for battle. While the Latins were still forming their squads, they suffered heavy casualties, specially by the hands of the numerous and well-experienced Bulgarian archers, who shot those still without their armour. In the meantime the Bulgarian cavalry managed to go round the Latin flanks and managed to attack their main forces. In the battle that ensued, the Crusaders lost many men and the Emperor himself was lariated, barely escaping from captivity - a knight managed to cut the rope with his sword and protected Henry from the Bulgarian arrows with his heavy armour. In the end the Crusaders, forced by Bulgarian cavalry, pulled back and retreated to Philippopolis (Plovdiv) in battle formation.

Aftermath 
The retreat continued for twelve days, in which the Bulgarians closely followed and harassed their opponents inflicting casualties mainly to the Latin rear-guard which was saved several times from complete collapse by the main Crusader forces. However, near Plovdiv the Crusaders finally accepted the battle and the Bulgarians were defeated.

References 

Йордан Андреев, Милчо Лалков, Българските ханове и царе, Велико Търново, 1996.

1208 in Europe
Battles involving the Second Bulgarian Empire
Battles involving the Latin Empire
Stara Zagora
13th century in Bulgaria
Bulgarian–Latin Wars
Conflicts in 1208